David Lewis (October 19, 1916 – December 11, 2000) was an American actor. He was best known for being the original actor to portray  Edward Quartermaine from 1978 to 1993 on the American soap opera General Hospital.

Early years
Lewis was born in Pittsburgh, Pennsylvania.

Television 
Lewis was a pioneering actor in television, his first televised role occurring in 1949 on the show Captain Video and His Video Rangers. His credits include appearing in seven episodes of Perry Mason and one episode of The Tom Ewell Show and in the recurring role of Warden Crichton in Batman. Lewis appeared on daytime television, making his soap debut on Love of Life as a murderer and later playing patriarch Henry Pierce on Bright Promise. Brief guest stints on The Young and the Restless and Days of Our Lives followed.

In 1978, he joined the cast of General Hospital in the role of Edward Quartermaine, for which he won a Daytime Emmy Award for Outstanding Supporting Actor in a Daytime Drama in 1982. Lewis took time off between 1987 and 1988 for medical recovery and departed in 1989 during which time Edward was believed to be dead. Lewis continued to come to the studio, however, to tape his voice so wife Lila could have conversations with him. Lewis made his comeback in November 1991 when Edward came back from the dead and in the summer of 1993, Lewis announced he was retiring permanently.

Lewis played Charles Ames on the ABC comedy The Farmer's Daughter (1963–1966).

Death 
Lewis died in Woodland Hills, California, after a long illness.

Filmography

References

External links

1916 births
2000 deaths
20th-century American male actors
American male television actors
American male soap opera actors
Daytime Emmy Award winners
Daytime Emmy Award for Outstanding Supporting Actor in a Drama Series winners
Male actors from Pennsylvania